Lake Chelan National Recreation Area is a national recreation area located about  south of the Canada–US border in Chelan County, Washington. It encompasses an area of  including the northern end of Lake Chelan and the surrounding area of the Stehekin Valley and the Stehekin River. The area is managed by the U.S. National Park Service as part of the North Cascades National Park Service Complex.

Lake Chelan NRA is adjacent to the North Cascades National Park South Unit. There are no roads that lead into Lake Chelan NRA. The recreation area and Stehekin, a small town in the park with fewer than 100 permanent residents, are accessible only by floatplane or passenger ferry from the south end of Lake Chelan near the town of Chelan, Washington. The area can also be accessed by hiking trails through the Cascade Range during the summer months. During the summer, an off-road bus service operated by the NPS carries weary hikers to the town from the Pacific Crest Trail.

Visitors to Lake Chelan NRA can get general information about the area at the Golden West Visitor Center located near the ferry landing. The Buckner Homestead Historic District, Purple Point-Stehekin Ranger Station House, and the one-room Stehekin School are in the Lake Chelan NRA.  They are all listed on the National Register of Historic Places.

See also
 Ecology of the North Cascades

References

External links

 National Park Service: Lake Chelan National Recreation Area

Protected areas of Chelan County, Washington
National Park Service National Recreation Areas
National Park Service areas in Washington (state)
Protected areas established in 1968
1968 establishments in Washington (state)